The malted milk is a type of biscuit, first produced by Elkes Biscuits of Uttoxeter (now owned by Fox's Biscuits) in 1924. They are named after their malt flavouring and milk content.

The design used varies according to the manufacturer, with variants including two milk churns and a cow.  They are typically baked for a short period of time (about 5 minutes) at high temperature to keep them crisp without the use of holes unlike other biscuits such as shortbread.

Variations of the biscuit include a chocolate covered single biscuit, as well as a custard cream like variety where two biscuits sandwich a vanilla-based cream.

See also
 Malted milk, the powdered grain and milk product for drinks
 Rich tea, the traditional biscuit that also includes malt but no milk
 Shortbread, the traditional Scottish biscuit that is rich in butter but contains no malt
 List of cookies

References

External links

Biscuits
Milk biscuit